Grands Rapids Union Station was a union station in Grand Rapids, Michigan. A Georgian Revival building of two stories, it was built in 1900 and was closed in 1958 and demolished over 1958 and 1959 to make space for a highway. Its address was 61 Ionia Avenue. It was a hub serving a few railroads going to different points in Michigan and other points in the Midwest.

History
In five years after the construction, 750,000 passengers passed through the station. In early decades, excursion Grand Rapids and Indiana Railroad trains to the station brought upwards to 2000 visitors on Sundays, coming from southern Michigan and Indiana.

Passenger services
The station served the Pere Marquette Railway (after the Chesapeake and Ohio Railway acquired the PM in 1947 C&O trains passed through), Michigan Central Railroad and Pennsylvania Railroad (which had acquired the GR&I). The Grand Trunk Western Railway and the New York Central Railroad were served at other stations in Grand Rapids. By 1946, Michigan Central operations were entirely folded into New York Central operations.

Noteworthy passenger train service at 1950 included:
Chesapeake and Ohio Railway (formerly the Pere Marquette Railway):
Pere Marquettes (Detroit [Fort Street Union Depot]–Lansing–Grand Rapids)
Resort Special (summer only night train, Chicago [Central Station]–Petoskey)
Grand Rapids–Petoskey; unnamed segments in off-season
New York Central Railroad:
unnamed train (Grand Rapids–Jackson–Detroit [Michigan Central Station])
Pennsylvania Railroad:
Northern Arrow (summer only night train, Cincinnati [Cincinnati Union Terminal]–Fort Wayne–Grand Rapids–Petoskey–Mackinaw City; unnamed segments in off-season)
unnamed local train on same route as above
unnamed train timed to connect at Cincinnati to the Louisville & Nashville's Southland, bound for Florida

Waning years
By the 1960s the Chesapeake and Ohio's trains were the only trains serving the successor to the station. The Chicago–Grand Rapid trains were added to the appellation, the Pere Marquettes in 1965. These trains ended in 1971 when C&O passed control of its passenger trains over to Amtrak.

Present-day station
In 1984 passenger trains returned with the introduction of Amtrak's Pere Marquette trains between Chicago and Grand Rapids. In 2004, the Vernon J. Ehlers Station, Grand Rapids' new station, opened.

References

External links
Grand Rapids Historical Commission report, photos on page 5, of the trainshed and the structure facing the street

Railway stations opened in 1900
Railway stations closed in 1958
1900 establishments in Michigan
Grand Rapids
Former Chesapeake and Ohio Railway stations
Former Pennsylvania Railroad stations
Former Pere Marquette Railway stations
Grand Rapids, Michigan
Buildings and structures in Grand Rapids, Michigan
Former railway stations in Michigan
Demolished railway stations in the United States